In mathematics, the Sturm series associated with a pair of polynomials is named after Jacques Charles François Sturm.

Definition

Let  and  two univariate polynomials. The Sturm series is constructed by:

This is almost the same algorithm as Euclid's but the remainder  has negative sign.

Sturm series associated to a characteristic polynomial
Let us see now Sturm series  associated to a characteristic polynomial  in the variable :

The remaining terms are defined with the above relation. Due to the special structure of these polynomials, they can be written in the form:

Moreover, the polynomial  replaced in the above relation gives the following recursive formulas for computation of the coefficients .

References

Mathematical series